Jack Selig Yellen (Jacek Jeleń; July 6, 1892 – April 17, 1991) was an American lyricist and screenwriter. He is best remembered for writing the lyrics to the songs "Happy Days Are Here Again", which was used by Franklin Roosevelt as the theme song for his successful 1932 presidential campaign, and "Ain't She Sweet", a Tin Pan Alley standard.

Early life and education
Born to a Jewish family in Poland, Yellen emigrated with his family to the United States when he was five years old. The oldest of seven children, he was raised in Buffalo, New York and began writing songs in high school. He graduated with honors from the University of Michigan in 1913 where he was a member of the Pi Lambda Phi fraternity. After graduating he became a reporter for the Buffalo Courier, continuing to write songs on the side.

Career
Yellen's first collaborator on a song was George L. Cobb, with whom he wrote a number of Dixie songs including "Alabama Jubilee", "Are You From Dixie?", and "All Aboard for Dixieland". He is best remembered for his collaboration with composer Milton Ager. He and Ager entered the music publishing business as part owners of the Ager-Yellen-Bornstein Music Company.  Yellen also worked with many other composers such as Sammy Fain and Harold Arlen.

Yellen's collaboration with vaudeville star, Sophie Tucker, for whom he was retained to write special material, produced one of Tucker's most well known songs, "My Yiddishe Momme", a song in English with some Yiddish text. Yellen wrote the lyrics which were set to music by Lew Pollack.
Yellen wrote the lyrics to more than 200 popular songs of the early 20th century. Two of his most recognized songs, still popular in the 21st century, are "Happy Days Are Here Again" and "Ain't She Sweet".

Yellen's screenwriting credits included George White's Scandals, Pigskin Parade, Little Miss Broadway, and Submarine Patrol.

Awards and legacy
Yellen was one of the earliest members of the American Society of Composers, Authors and Publishers (ASCAP) and served on its board of directors from 1951 to 1969.  In 1972 he was inducted into the Songwriters Hall of Fame, and the Buffalo Music Hall of Fame in 1996.

Personal life
In August 1922, Yellen married 21 year old Sylvia Stiller of Buffalo.  They had two children, David and Beth.
In 1944 he married his second wife, Lucille Hodgeman.  Lucille was born in Minnesota in 1915 and raised in Los Angeles. As a dancer and choreographer, she worked with Metro-Goldwyn-Mayer and 20th Century Fox under the stage name Lucille Day on over 20 films, including The Wizard of Oz. The Yellens lived for many years on a farm on Mortons Corners Road in the town of Concord, New York. Jack Yellen died April 17, 1991 in Concord at the age of 98. Lucille Yellen died on August 15, 2010 at age 95.

Broadway musicals

Film scores

Selected songs
 "Alabama Jubilee" – 1915
 "Are You from Dixie ('Cause I'm from Dixie Too)" – 1915
 "Dancing 'Round the U.S.A" - 1915 
 "There's a Garden in Hawaii" with music by George B. McConnell – 1917
 "Battle Song of Liberty" - 1917. m: George L. Cobb
 "Johnny Get Your Gun and Be a Soldier" - 1917. m: Jack Glogau
 "Over the Rhine" - 1917. m: Albert Gumble
 "So Long Sammy" - 1917. m: Albert Gumble
 "There's a Vacant Chair in My Old Southern Home" - 1917. m: Al. Piantadosi
 "When It's Circus Day Back Home" - 1917. m: Jack Glogau
 "There's a Lump of Sugar Down in Dixie" - 1918. m: Albert Gumble
 "We're Coming from Cody" - 1918. m: Pvt. Harry Wessel
 "I'm Waiting For Ships That Never Come In" – 1919, recorded by Moon Mullican in 1958.
 "Alexander's Band Is Back in Dixie" - 1919. m: Albert Gumble
 "Cootie Tickle, The (Over Here It's the Shimmie Dance)" - 1919. m: Abe Olman
 "Don't Put a Tax on the Beautiful Girls" - 1919 with Milton Ager
 "Johnny's in Town" - 1919. m: Geo. W. Meyer & Abe Olman
 "Down By The O-Hi-O" – 1921
 "Louisville Lou" – 1923
 "Mama Goes Where Papa Goes" – 1923
 "Big Bad Bill (Is Sweet William Now)" – 1924
 "Hula Lou" – 1924
 "Hard Hearted Hannah (The Vamp Of Savannah)" – 1924
 "I Wonder What's Become of Sally" – 1924
 "Cheatin' on Me" – 1925
 "In Your Green Hat" – 1925
 "My Yiddishe Momme" – 1925 with music by Lew Pollack and a huge success for Sophie Tucker.
 "No Man's Mama" – 1925 with music by Lew Pollack
 "Crazy Words, Crazy Tune" – 1926
 "Ain't She Sweet" – 1927
 "Glad Rag Doll" – 1929
 "Happy Feet" – 1930
 "Happy Days Are Here Again" – 1930
 "Are You Havin' Any Fun?" – 1939 with music by Sammy Fain
 "Life Begins At Forty" – 1937 music and lyrics by Jack Yellen and Ted Shapiro, recorded by Sophie Tucker.

Notes

References
Laurie, Joe, Jr. Vaudeville: From the Honky-tonks to the Palace. New York: Henry Holt, 1953. p. 59.
Yellen, Jack: "The Songwriter and the Red Head". Buffalo Courier Express March 15–22, 1970.

External links

"Alabama jubilee", New York: Remick Music Corp., 1915, from the Alabama Sheet Music Collection
 Jack Yellen recordings at the Discography of American Historical Recordings.
 Interview with Mrs. Jack (Lucille) Yellen
 

1892 births
1991 deaths
American male screenwriters
Polish emigrants to the United States
Jewish American songwriters
American people of Polish-Jewish descent
Musicians from Buffalo, New York
University of Michigan alumni
20th-century American musicians
Songwriters from New York (state)
Screenwriters from New York (state)
20th-century American male writers
20th-century American screenwriters
20th-century American Jews